1,3-Dioxetane (1,3-dioxacyclobutane) is a heterocyclic organic compound with formula C2O2H4, whose backbone is a four-member ring of alternating oxygen and carbon atoms. It can be viewed as a dimer of formaldehyde (COH2).

Derivatives of 1,3-dioxetane are rarely encountered as intermediates in the literature. Usually, they are prepared via [2+2] cycloadditions of two carbonyl compounds. Molecular orbital theory calculations suggest that they should be more stable than the 1,2-isomers, which are more intensively studied.

See also
 1,2-Dioxetane

References 

Dioxetanes